ALMASat-1 (ALma MAter SATellite) was a micro satellite developed by University of Bologna for demonstrative purposes to benefit Earth observation missions. The project was funded by Italian Ministry of Research.

About the satellite
The satellite was made from high quality aluminium and reinforced with eight stainless steel plates. Solar cells were mounted on four sides of satellite for providing the power required for satellite operation.

Mission
The work on development of ALMASat was started in 2003. It was expected to be launched into orbit on a Dnepr rocket. Later it was launched by Vega launch vehicle with other satellites on board.

The ALMASat-1 was a microsatellite having a cuboidal structure, meant for a demo purpose, it accommodated payloads of different sizes and power requirements.
The main purpose of ALMASat-1 was to test the 3-axis pointing accuracy for the future satellite launches.

Launch
ALMASAT-1 was launched by Vega launch system on February 13, 2012, from Kourou, French Guiana.

Re-entry
ALMASAT-1 decayed from orbit 25 April 2020.

References

External links 

 ALma MAter SATellite Official Site
 ALMASAT at European Space Agency

Student satellites
Satellites of Italy
University of Bologna
Spacecraft launched in 2012
2012 in Italy
Spacecraft launched by Vega rockets